is a train station in the village of Chikuhoku, Higashichikuma District, Nagano Prefecture, Japan, operated by East Japan Railway Company (JR East).

Lines
Nishijō Station is served by the Shinonoi Line and is 37.2 kilometers from the terminus of the line at Shiojiri Station.

Station layout
The station consists of one ground-level island platform and one side platform serving a three tracks, connected to the station building by a footbridge. The station is a  Kan'i itaku station.

Platforms

History
Nishijō Station opened on 1 November 1900. With the privatization of Japanese National Railways (JNR) on 1 April 1987, the station came under the control of JR East.

Passenger statistics
In fiscal 2015, the station was used by an average of 178 passengers daily (boarding passengers only).

Surrounding area

See also
 List of railway stations in Japan

References

External links

 JR East station information 

Railway stations in Nagano Prefecture
Railway stations in Japan opened in 1900
Stations of East Japan Railway Company
Shinonoi Line
Chikuhoku, Nagano